Álvaro Felipe Henríquez Pettinelli (born 18 October 1969) is a Chilean singer-songwriter, best known for being the vocalist and guitarist of the band Los Tres, considered by MusicaPopular.cl to be "the great musical symbol of the 1990s in Chile".

References

1969 births
Living people
Chilean guitarists
Male guitarists
Chilean male singer-songwriters
Musicians from Concepción, Chile
Chilean multi-instrumentalists
Rock guitarists
Singers from Concepción, Chile
University of Concepción alumni